Euriphene atropurpurea, or Aurivillius' nymph, is a butterfly in the family Nymphalidae. It is found in Nigeria, Cameroon, Gabon and the Republic of the Congo. The habitat consists of forests.

References

Butterflies described in 1894
Euriphene
Butterflies of Africa